“Only a River" is a song by Bob Weir, written in collaboration with Josh Ritter. The song is the first single from his third solo album, Blue Mountain. The album was written by Weir in collaboration with members of The National; Josh Ritter, Josh Kaufman, Scott Devendorf, Joe Russo, and The Walkmen's Walter Martin, along with lyricists Josh Ritter, Gerrit Graham, and John Perry Barlow. The producer is Josh Kaufman.

"Only a River" was released on NPR's All Things Considered for streaming.

Musicians
Bob Weir – Vocals, Guitar
Aaron Dessner – Electric Guitar
Scott Devendorf – Bass, Vocals
Ray Rizzo – drums, harmonium, harmonica, backup vocals
Josh Kaufman – lyrics
Rob Burger –  keyboard, accordion, tuned percussion

References

Songs written by Bob Weir
2016 songs